The Khuddakapatha (Pali for "short passages"; abbreviated as "Khp") is a Theravada Buddhist scripture, the first collection of discourses (suttas) in the Khuddaka Nikaya of the Pali Canon.  It may have originated as a handbook for novice monks composed from excerpts of canonical texts.

History
The Khuddakapāṭha was excluded from the lists of canonical texts collected by the Theravada Digha- and Majjhima-bhanakas as well as the Chinese translation of Buddhaghosa's commentaries. This suggest that the Khuddakapāṭha had not attained canonical status until relatively late in the process of fixing the Theravada canon, and may be one of the last texts added to the Canon itself. 

All but one of the discourses it collects are found elsewhere in the Pali Canon- the Nidhi Kanda is not extant in the current Pali Canon but does include text [Khp 8.9] quoted in the Abhidhamma Pitaka's Kathavatthu [Kv 351,18-21].) It may have originated as a handbook for novices composed from excerpts from the canon, and was accepted as canonical because it consisted of texts that were already part of the Canon. The Khuddakapāṭha is not widely used or studied in modern Theravada countries, but several of its texts are included in a common Paritta collection (the Maha Pirit Potha), suggesting that this collection originated with the Khuddakapāṭha or a precursor text.

Contents
The collection is composed of the following nine discourses:
 "Going for Refuge" (Saranattayam)
 "Ten Precepts" (Dasasikkhapadam)
 "Thirty-two Parts [of the Body]" (Dvattimsakaro)
 "Novice's Questions" (Kumarapanha)
 "Discourse on Blessings" (Mangala Sutta)
 "Discourse on Treasures" (Ratana Sutta)
 "[Hungry Shades] Outside the Wall Chapter" (Tirokutta Sutta)
 "Reserve Fund Chapter" (Nidhikanda Sutta)
 "Discourse on Lovingkindess" (Metta Sutta)

Translations 
 Tr R. C. Childers, in Journal of the Royal Asiatic Society, 1869
 Tr F. L. Woodward, in Some Sayings of the Buddha, 1925
 "The text of the minor sayings", in Minor Anthologies of the Pali Canon, volume I, tr C. A. F. Rhys Davids, 1931, Pali Text Society, Bristol
 "The minor readings", in 1 volume with "The illustrator of ultimate meaning", its commentary, tr Nanamoli, 1960, Pali Text Society, Bristol

Notes

Sources
CSCD Tipitaka Version 2.0. A compiled CD-ROM with the Sixth Sangha Council's Tipitaka collection.

External links 
"Khuddakapatha: The Short Passages", index of suttas from this collection on www.accesstoinsight.org.
Complete Text and Translation

Khuddaka Nikaya